A Broken Sole is a 2006 trilogy of short films directed by Antony Marsellis and written by Susan Charlotte, dealing with the September 11 attacks in 2001.

Plot
Based on three short plays by Susan Charlotte, the film follows the lives of six characters: a shoemaker and his customer, a taxi driver and his passenger, and a dyslexic director and his date.

The Shoemaker
On September 11, 2001, a shoemaker (Danny Aiello) is frantic to close his shop early. A college professor with a broken sole (Judith Light) is desperate for him to keep the shop open. With the backdrop of tragedy, a pair of shoes on a shelf awaits the return of its owner, who will never return for them.

Danny Aiello would reprise this role off-broadway in 2010 and 2011 in The Shoemaker.

The Cabbie
In October 2001 a nervous real-estate broker (Laila Robins) takes a ride with an over-enunciating cab driver (Bob Dishy).

The Dyslexic Lover
In December 2001 Nan (Margaret Colin), an actress who supports herself with a job at a travel agency and Bob (John Shea), a dyslexic director try to come to terms with their on-again, off-again relationship.

Cast
 Danny Aiello - The Shoemaker
 Margaret Colin - Nan
 Bob Dishy	- Cabbie
 Judith Light - Hilary
 Laila Robins - Passenger
 Rebekkah Ross - Louise's Voice (voice)
 John Shea	- Bob

Score
An original composition by Philip Glass appears in this film, originally commissioned by Susan Charlotte for the short film; Love Divided By. It also appears on his album "Saxophone."

References

External links
 

2006 films
Films based on the September 11 attacks
2000s English-language films